The  Silver Heel  is a Chesapeake Bay log canoe, built in 1902, in Kent County, Maryland  by Eugene Thompson for John Wesley Dickinson.  She is a 33'-11" sailing log canoe in the racing fleet. She has a beam of 7'-3/4". She has a clipper bow, with the longhead braced to serve as a bowsprit, and a straight, raking stern. The canoe is privately owned and races under No. 2. She one of the last 22 surviving traditional Chesapeake Bay racing log canoes that carry on a tradition of racing on the Eastern Shore of Maryland that has existed since the 1840s. She is located at Chestertown, Kent County, Maryland.

She was listed on the National Register of Historic Places in 1985.

References

External links
, including photo in 1984, at Maryland Historical Trust

Kent County, Maryland
Ships on the National Register of Historic Places in Maryland
National Register of Historic Places in Kent County, Maryland